Dr. Zlatan Čolaković (February 13, 1955 – 2008) was a Bosnian Homerist, philologist and researcher.

He graduated with a degree in Comparative Literature and Philosophy (1979), finished his Masters (1982) and completed his Doctorate in 1984 at the University of Zagreb Faculty of Philosophy. From 1984-1988, as a Fulbright scholar, he worked with Albert Lord at Harvard University in Milman Parry Collection, the Slavic division of the Widener Library. He lectured at Harvard University and at Waterloo University in Ontario, Canada. At Harvard, he worked on the Milman Parry Collection where he transcribed and edited texts and audio tapes of over 90,000 verses of Bosnian epic songs. At UCLA he held renown lecture "South Slavic Muslim Epics, Problems of Collecting, Editing and Publishing". He published the long essay with the same title in California Slavic Studies in which he proved the numerous mistakes in transcription of Harvard publications of South Slavic oral epics, history of collecting South Slavic epics and importance of preserving the epics on film.

During 1989, he collected Bosnian epics on the field with his wife Marina Rojc-Čolaković and was first to collect entire Bosnian epic songs on film. He moved to Canada where he conducted research on the epic transcriptions which would result in two volumes and his theory of Post-Tradition and the Post-Traditional Homer. In Canada, he worked as a court translator for years. As the editor and heir to the literary legacy of Enver Čolaković, he published many of his father's works (Izabrane pjesme, novels Mali svijet, Lokljani, Iz Bosne o Bosni), and prepared Čolaković's books for publication: Jedinac, Biblijske price XX. stoljeca, Knjiga majci. In 1989 he published his book The Eagles of the Tragic World which encompasses all ancient Greek tragedies, Aristotle and mythic story, and a chapter about epics. He received the Government of Canada Award for his contribution to folklore in 1991.  He founded and was the chief researcher of the project The Essence of Bosniak Epics which was sponsored by Matica Hrvatska and financed by the Croatian Ministry of Science.

The fruits of his field work in Montenegro, resulted in an immense book written jointly with his wife Marina Rojc-Colakovic Mrtva Glava Jezik Progovara (transl. A Dead Head Utters a Word), Almanah, Podgorica, 2004, 670 pages. This book, written, in both English and Croatian, contains epics from Avdo Međedović and Murat Kurtagić, a comprehensive analysis of the epics which demonstrates his theory of the Post-Traditional Homer and his field notes. In his essay "The Singer above Tales", Zlatan Čolaković offers the new approach to resolve Homeric Question. He distinguishes traditional and post-traditional oral epics, contrary to the contemporary Homeric scholarship, thus moving Homeric Question in the new direction.
He was a member of the Croatian Writers' Society, PEN-a, and the Harvard Club of Croatia and Canada. In 2007, "Almanah" from Podgorica published two bilingual critical editions of the poems of Avdo Mededovic.

Zlatan Čolaković died in Boston on December 20, 2008.

The Post-Traditional Homer
"Post-traditional singers have mastered the technique of epic-creating and of diction far beyond the powers of traditional singers of tales. They were fully aware of it, to the point of a hubristic mastering of tradition itself. They felt that only a good singer could make a good epic and that a bad singer would make a poor epic poem even from the finest epic poem, learned from the best singer. Although this seems obvious to us, it runs counter to the conservative logic of tradition, as it situates the singer above the tales."

"...Homer and Mededovic also "overdo" or magnify the events within a traditionally inherited plot to the extreme. While doing it, they feel free to absorb many other individual poems, or at least many of their themes, into the hybrid poem that they create, thus diminishing the tradition's variety of poems."

(Dr. Zlatan Colakovic, The Singer Above Tales, The Epics of Avdo Mededovic Volume II)

References

1955 births
2008 deaths
Faculty of Humanities and Social Sciences, University of Zagreb alumni
Writers from Zagreb